Manuel Selman (born 14 March 1989) is a Chilean surfer. He competed in the 2020 Summer Olympics.

References

1989 births
Living people
Chilean surfers
Olympic surfers of Chile
Surfers at the 2020 Summer Olympics
Sportspeople from Viña del Mar